The 2004–05 Serie C1 was the twenty-seventh edition of Serie C1, the third highest league in the Italian football league system.

Overview

Serie C1/A
It was contested by 19 teams, and U.S. Cremonese won the championship. It was decided that U.S. Cremonese, A.C. Mantova was promoted to Serie B, and A.S. Andria BAT, F.C. Vittoria, Calcio Como, A.C. Prato was demoted in Serie C2.

Serie C1/B
It was contested by 18 teams, and Rimini Calcio F.C. won the championship. It was decided that Rimini Calcio F.C., U.S. Avellino was promoted to Serie B, and A.C. Reggiana 1919, Benevento Calcio, SPAL 1907, A.S. Sora, A.S.D. Nuova Vis Pesaro Calcio 2006 was demoted to Serie C2.

League standings

Serie C1/A

Play-off

Quarter-finals

|-
| style="background:#eee" colspan=4 |
|-

Final

Play-out

|-
| style="background:#eee" colspan=4 |
|-

Serie C1/B

Play-off

Semifinal

|-
| style="background:#eee" colspan=4 |
|-

Final

Play-out

|-
| style="background:#eee" colspan=4 |
|-

External links
Italy Third Level 2004/05 at RSSSF

Serie C1 seasons
Italy
3